Popular Alliance was a political coalition of two of the oldest and historically recognized political parties in Peru, the Peruvian Aprista Party (PAP), led by former President Alan García, and the Christian People's Party (PPC), led by Lourdes Flores. The alliance was made by mutual agreement by both leaders with the objective of leading García for a third non-consecutive presidential term in the 2016 general election. The third member of the coalition was the minor political party Go Peru (VP), led by Mayor of Callao Juan Sotomayor.

The coalition ticket was composed of Alan García as the presidential nominee, and Lourdes Flores Nano (former Congresswoman and 2001 and 2006 presidential nominee) and David Salazar Morote (former Governor of the Apurímac Region) as first and second running mates.

The coalition was dissolved after its poor results on the general election, held on April 10, 2016.

Election results

Presidential election

Elections to the Congress of the Republic

References

Defunct political party alliances in Peru
2015 establishments in Peru